The 1991–92 Algerian League Cup officially called 1991–92 Federation Cup, was the 1st season of the Algerian League Cup. The competition is open to all 16 Algerian clubs participating in the Algerian Championnat National of the 1991–92 season. This season was stopped in semi-final for security reasons in Algeria.

Group stage

Group A

Group B

Group C

Group D

Knockout stage

Quarter-finals
In Béjaïa

In Chlef

Semi-finals

References

External links
 Coupe de la Ligue - rsssf.com

Algerian League Cup
Algerian League Cup
Algerian League Cup